Donyland Lodge was an independent school in Rowhedge, Colchester in the United Kingdom
The school catered for children with complex behavioural, social and emotional difficulties.

See also
Secondary schools in Essex

References

Defunct schools in Essex
Defunct special schools in England